Vitoše is a village located in the municipality of Brus, Serbia. According to the 2011 census, the village has a population of 37 people.

References

Populated places in Rasina District